The ONIOM (short for 'Our own n-layered Integrated molecular Orbital and Molecular mechanics') method is a computational approach  developed by Morokuma and co-workers. ONIOM is a hybrid method that enables different ab initio, semi-empirical, or molecular mechanics methods to be applied to different parts of a molecule/system in combination to produce reliable geometry and energy at reduced computational cost.

The ONIOM computational approach has been found to be particularly useful for modeling biomolecular systems as well as for transition metal complexes and catalysts.

Codes that support ONIOM
Gaussian
NWChem
ORCA (quantum chemistry program)

See also
QM/MM
Steric effects (ONIOM to separate Steric effects vs. electronic effects)

External links

References

Computational chemistry
Quantum chemistry